Nelson Mandela: An International Tribute for a Free South Africa was a music concert that took place on 16 April 1990 at Wembley Stadium in London, England, and was broadcast to more than 60 countries. It was held two months after the release of Nelson Mandela from a South African apartheid prison and was regarded by Mandela as an official international reception.

Background
The success of an earlier concert, a 70th birthday-tribute concert to Mandela in June 1988, held while the black South African leader was still in prison, and the growing likelihood that he would be released reasonably soon led Mandela's lawyer to ask Tony Hollingsworth, producer of the first concert, to organise the 1990 concert.

Mandela, his party, the African National Congress and the Anti-Apartheid Movement were convinced that the first event increased global pressure on the South African regime to release Mandela—a move that would be the first step in releasing other political prisoners and ending the apartheid regime.

Mandela's lawyer and Mike Terry, head of the Anti-Apartheid Movement in London, met Hollingsworth in London in December 1989. According to his lawyer, Mandela was insisting on two conditions: that he would be able to talk for any length of time and that the speech would not be edited on television. It was also agreed that the widest possible international television coverage would be sought after, and that broadcast fees and gate money would not be profit-driven, but would rather be used to cover the costs of staging the concert.

At one stage, Mandela considered disassociating himself from the planned concert, after senior ANC figures persuaded him that he should not be holding such an event in "Thatcher’s country", as the ANC believed that British Prime Minister Margaret Thatcher had supported the apartheid regime. He was eventually persuaded to proceed with his participation in the event by Archbishop Trevor Huddleston, president of the Anti-Apartheid Movement.

Event

Mandela was on stage for 45 minutes and received a standing ovation for the first eight minutes of this time period. During his time on stage, he called for sanctions against South Africa to be maintained and for people across the world to continue pressing for an apartheid's abolition.

Artist line-up
The musical line-up at the Wembley event included: Anita Baker, Bonnie Raitt, Chrissie Hynde, Jackson Browne, Lou Reed, Natalie Cole, Neil Young, Peter Gabriel, Simple Minds, Tracy Chapman and Stetsasonic, in addition to the following artists:

Aswad
Ben Elton
Caiphus Semenya
Daniel Lanois
Denzel Washington
Dudu Pukwana
Geoffrey Oryema
George Duke
Jerry Dammers
Johnny Clegg
Jonas Gwangwa
Jungle Brothers
Lenny Henry
Letta Mbulu
Little Steven
Manhattan Brothers
Mica Paris
Neneh Cherry
Neville Brothers
Patti LaBelle
Shikisha
Steven Van Zandt (Little Steven)
Terence Trent D'Arby
Youssou N’Dour

References

External links

Tony Hollingsworth's official website

Tribute, International
Rock festivals in England
Music festivals in London
Concerts at Wembley Stadium
Tribute concerts in the United Kingdom
1990 in London
1990 in music
April 1990 events in the United Kingdom